I Remember is a studio album by American recording artist Meli'sa Morgan, released in 2005 and issued by Lu Ann/Orpheus Records. The album consist of three covers produced by Valerie Simpson and Nickolas Ashford, as well as new songs produced by Morgan and longtime collaborator Lesette Wilson. The album's lead single "Back Together Again" is a ballad duet with R&B singer Freddie Jackson.

Track listing

Credits
Credits taken from album liner notes.
Executive-Producer – Beau Huggins, Charli Huggins*
Mastered By – Jim Brick
Mixed By – Ari Raskin (tracks: 9, 15), Denis Feres (tracks: 4, 6, 8, 10 to 14, 16, 17), Kevin Crouse (tracks: 5), Royal *Bayyan (tracks: 7), Yasha* (tracks: 3)
Recorded By – Denis Feres (tracks: 2, 8, 12, 16, 17), John Bender (2) (tracks: 3), Josh McDonnell* (tracks: 4, 6, 10, 11, 13, 14), Royal Bayyan (tracks: 7), Shawn Lucas (tracks: 15), Tarik Bayyan (tracks: 7), YZ (3) (tracks: 5, 9)
Recorded By [Additional] – Mike Rogers (tracks: 3)
Piano - Shawn V. Lucas (track 1), Valerie Simpson (tracks: 2, 8, 12, 16)
Background vocals - Vaughn Harper, Balewa Muhammond, Meli'sa Morgan
Producer - Yasha (track 3)
Producers [Instruments], Arranged by - Royal Bayyan, Lesette Wilson, Meli'sa Morgan
Phonographic Copyright (p) – Orpheus Music, 
Copyright (c) – Orpheus Music, 
Phonographic Copyright (p) – Lu Ann Entertainment, 
Copyright (c) – Lu Ann EntertainmentDistributed, Manufactured By – Orpheus Music

Singles

References

2005 albums
Meli'sa Morgan albums